Steven Glenn Johnson (born 1973) is an American mathematician known for being a co-creator of the FFTW library for software-based fast Fourier transforms and for his work on photonic crystals. He is professor of Applied Mathematics and Physics at MIT where he leads a group on Nanostructures and Computation.

While working on his PhD at MIT, he developed the Fastest Fourier Transform in the West (FFTW) library with funding from the DoD NDSEG Fellowship. Steven Johnson and his colleague Matteo Frigo were awarded the 1999 J. H. Wilkinson Prize for Numerical Software for this work.

He is the author of the NLOpt library for nonlinear optimization. He is a frequent contributor to the Julia programming language, and has also contributed to Python, R, and Matlab. He was a keynote speaker for the 2019 JuliaCon conference.

References

External links
 Steven G. Johnson, Photonic-crystal and microstructured fiber tutorials (2005).
 John D. Joannopoulos, Steven G. Johnson, Joshua N. Winn, and Robert D. Meade, Photonic Crystals: Molding the Flow of Light, second edition (Princeton, 2008), chapter 9. (Readable online.)

Living people
Massachusetts Institute of Technology alumni
American computer scientists
MIT Department of Physics alumni
Optical engineers
Optical physicists
1973 births